Chalk Mountain is a small unincorporated community in Erath County, Texas, United States.  It lies along U.S. Route 67 near the Somervell County line, about 12 miles southwest of Glen Rose. In 2009 Chalk Mountain was the site of a meteorite hoax. United States Navy SEAL Sniper Chris Kyle and Chad Littlefield were murdered at a shooting range near Chalk Mountain on February 2, 2013.

Notable person
Jerry Naylor, recording artist, disc jockey, and television and radio personality

Climate
The climate in this area is characterized by hot, humid summers and generally mild to cool winters.  According to the Köppen Climate Classification system, Chalk Mountain has a humid subtropical climate, abbreviated "Cfa" on climate maps.

Meteorite hoax
In May 2009 Manfred Cuntz, a professor of physics and the director of the astronomy program at the University of Texas at Arlington, was called in to investigate a supposed meteorite impact. Cuntz along with other experts, a Fox TV crew and the property owner met at the site. They found a refrigerator-sized gray-white rock at the end of a trench. A few smashed trees were nearby, but no signs of burning could be seen. Arthur Ehlmann, a professor of geology at the Texas Christian University and an expert in meteoric research, chipped off a piece of the stone and pronounced it to be made of limestone, which was plentiful in the area. Generally, meteorites are not composed of limestone. Local newspapers, TV and the Texas Mutual UFO network sensationalized the story trying to explain how it could be a meteorite despite its composition, lack of burning as it would have had if it zipped through the atmosphere. A meteorite of this size would have "caused widespread devastation", yet nothing of this sort occurred. Later on, Cuntz received an email that linked the property owner to being the owner of an earth-moving equipment company. His website mentioned that their equipment could move rock of any size. Cuntz made the Fox TV station aware of his conclusion that this meteorite impact was probably a hoax, and the TV station took the news clip off their website.

References

Bibliography
T. Lindsay Baker, Ghost Towns of Texas (Norman: University of Oklahoma Press, 1986).
Vallie Eoff, A History of Erath County, Texas (M.A. thesis, University of Texas, 1937).

External links
Chalk Mountain, Texas from the Handbook of Texas Online
Chalk Mountain info at Howe Town Locator.com website
Chalk Mountain info and history at ghosttowns.com

Unincorporated communities in Texas
Unincorporated communities in Erath County, Texas
Ghost towns in East Texas